The CBS Radio Workshop was an experimental dramatic radio anthology series that aired on CBS from January 27, 1956, until September 22, 1957. Subtitled “radio’s distinguished series to man’s imagination,” it was a revival of the earlier Columbia Experimental Laboratory (1931), Columbia Experimental Dramatic Laboratory (1932) and  Columbia Workshop broadcasts by CBS from 1936 to 1943, and used some of the same writers and directors employed on the earlier series. The CBS Radio Workshop was one of American network radio's last attempts to hold on to, and perhaps recapture, some of the demographics they had lost to television in the post-World War II era.

The premiere broadcast was a two-part adaptation of Aldous Huxley's Brave New World, introduced and narrated by Huxley. It took a unique approach to sound effects, as described in a Time (February 6, 1956) review that week:
It took three radio sound men, a control-room engineer and five hours of hard work to create the sound that was heard for less than 30 seconds on the air. The sound consisted of a ticking metronome, tom-tom beats, bubbling water, air hose, cow moo, boing! (two types), oscillator, dripping water (two types) and three kinds of wine glasses clicking against each other. Judiciously blended and recorded on tape, the effect was still not quite right. Then the tape was played backward with a little echo added. That did it. The sound depicted the manufacturing of babies in the radio version of Aldous Huxley's Brave New World.Time, February 6, 1956

Music for the series was composed by  Bernard Herrmann, Jerry Goldsmith, Amerigo Moreno, Ray Noble and Leith Stevens. Writers whose work was adapted for the series included John Cheever, Robert A. Heinlein, Sinclair Lewis, H. L. Mencken, Edgar Allan Poe, Christopher Isherwood, Frederik Pohl, James Thurber, Mark Twain and Thomas Wolfe.

References

Listen to

See also
 Destination Freedom − a Chicago based radio drama which played Sunday mornings (1948–1950)

External links
 The Definitive: CBS Radio Workshop
 Old Time Radio Review: CBS Radio Workshop – episode reviews
 Voice Chasers
 Jerry Haendiges Vintage Radio Logs: The CBS Radio Workshop
 Audio Classics Archive Radio Logs: The CBS Radio Workshop

1950s American radio programs
CBS Radio programs
American radio dramas
Experimental radio
Anthology radio series